Iago Bouzón Amoedo (born 16 March 1983) is a Spanish retired footballer who played as a versatile defender.

Club career

Born in Redondela, Province of Pontevedra, Bouzón made his professional debut for local powerhouse RC Celta de Vigo four days shy of his 17th birthday, but would only appear in four first-team games in his first five years combined, playing mainly with the reserves. In his last season he also featured very sparingly, as the Galicians returned to La Liga after one year out.

Bouzón signed with Recreativo de Huelva in 2005, initially on loan. He was an important defensive element for an Andalusian side that achieved top flight promotion in the 2005–06 campaign.

In late June 2010, after experiencing one of his best seasons as a professional – 30 matches, two goals, although Recre only finished in ninth position in the second division – Bouzón signed as a free agent with AC Omonia of Cyprus, for two years. In November, he suffered a serious injury that sidelined him for eight months.

Bouzón subsequently returned to Spain and its second level, representing Xerez CD, Córdoba CF and Gimnàstic de Tarragona. He promoted to the top division with the second club at the end of 2013–14, contributing to the feat with 32 appearances and one goal.

Honours

Club
Omonia
Cypriot Cup: 2010–11, 2011–12
Cypriot Super Cup: 2010

International
Spain U20
FIFA U-20 World Cup: Runner-up 2003

References

External links
 
 
 
 
 
 
 
 

1983 births
Living people
Spanish footballers
Footballers from Redondela
Association football defenders
La Liga players
Segunda División players
Segunda División B players
Tercera División players
Celta de Vigo B players
RC Celta de Vigo players
Recreativo de Huelva players
Xerez CD footballers
Córdoba CF players
Gimnàstic de Tarragona footballers
Cypriot First Division players
AC Omonia players
Spain youth international footballers
Spain under-21 international footballers
Spanish expatriate footballers
Expatriate footballers in Cyprus
Spanish expatriate sportspeople in Cyprus